Godfrey Peter Scott, known as Peter Scott, (born 1944) is a British mathematician, known for the Scott core theorem.

Scott received his PhD in 1969 from the University of Warwick under Brian Joseph Sanderson. Scott was a professor at the University of Liverpool and later at the University of Michigan.

His research deals with low-dimensional geometric topology, differential geometry, and geometric group theory. He has done research on the geometric topology of 3-dimensional manifolds, 3-dimensional hyperbolic geometry, minimal surface theory, hyperbolic groups, and Kleinian groups with their associated geometry, topology, and group theory.

In 1973, he proved what is now known as the Scott core theorem or the Scott compact core theorem. He had previously proved that, given a fundamental group  of a 3-manifold, if  is finitely generated then  must be finitely presented.

In 1986, he was awarded the Senior Berwick Prize. In 2012, he was elected a Fellow of the American Mathematical Society.

Selected publications
 Compact submanifolds of 3-manifolds, Journal of the London Mathematical Society. Second Series vol. 7 (1973), no. 2, 246–250 (proof of the theorem on the compact core) 
 Finitely generated 3-manifold groups are finitely presented. J. London Math. Soc. Second Series vol. 6 (1973), 437–440 
 Subgroups of surface groups are almost geometric. J. London Math. Soc. Second Series vol. 17 (1978), no. 3, 555–565. (proof that surface groups are LERF) 
 Correction to "Subgroups of surface groups are almost geometric J. London Math. Soc. vol. 2 (1985), no. 2, 217–220 
 There are no fake Seifert fibre spaces with infinite π1. Ann. of Math. Second Series, vol. 117 (1983), no. 1, 35–70 

 with William H. Meeks: Finite group actions on 3-manifolds. Invent. Math. vol. 86 (1986), no. 2, 287–346 
Introduction to 3-Manifolds, University of Maryland, College Park 1975

with Gadde A. Swarup: Regular neighbourhoods and canonical decompositions for groups, Société Mathématique de France, 2003
 Regular neighbourhoods and canonical decompositions for groups, Electron. Res. Announc. Amer. Math. Soc. vol. 8 (2002), 20–28

References

External links
 Homepage

20th-century English mathematicians
21st-century English  mathematicians
Alumni of the University of Warwick
Academics of the University of Liverpool
University of Michigan faculty
Fellows of the American Mathematical Society
1945 births
Living people
Topologists
Group theorists